Ulla Kadathal is a 2005 Indian Tamil-language romantic drama film directed by Pugazhendhi Thangaraj. The film stars Vignesh, Yugendran, and Kutty Radhika, with Pandu, Suja Varunee, Priyadarshini and Malaysia Vasudevan playing supporting roles. It was released on 18 February 2005.

Plot

Ramya (Kutty Radhika) and her best friend Samyuktha (Suja Varunee) are students in visual communication. Ramya is a soft-spoken woman while Samyuktha is an outspoken and carefree woman. Ramya falls in love with Robert (Yugendran), a freelance photographer who comes to her college for a teaching stint. They begin to meet each other and they fall in love with each other. One day, Robert reveals that he grew up in an orphanage and he is willing to marry her. Ramya's brother Sakthi (Vignesh) is overprotective and a stubborn person, Sakthi wants her to marry the man he has chosen: a USA-based groom. Ramya tries to convince her parents and her brother to marry her lover but Sakthi has a bad opinion of Robert. Sakthi and her parents then start the marriage preparation.

Robert and Ramya decide to elope with the help of their friends and they get married in a temple. The night of their first night, an angry Sakthi finds their place and reveals his sister that their parents had committed suicide following her elopement. Ramya decides to stay with her brother for a few months, the problem escalates and Sakthi takes this opportunity to fulfil his wish but her sister-in-law Malar (Priyadarshini) tries to stop it. Later, Ramya becomes pregnant and Sakthi wants her to abort the baby but Ramya refuses. One day, he lies to his sister that they are going to the temple and he tries to bring her to the doctor. Robert comes to her rescue and saves her. During the fight between Sakthi and Robert, Sakthi falls from a building and they take him to the nearby hospital. Ramya sold her thaali to pay the hospital bills and Sakthi is saved by the doctor. Sakthi finally understands his mistake. Robert and Ramya lived happily ever after.

Cast

Vignesh as Sakthi
Yugendran as Robert
Kutty Radhika as Ramya
Pandu
Suja Varunee as Samyuktha
Priyadarshini as Malar, Sakthi's wife
Malaysia Vasudevan as Brahim
Priyanka as Samyuktha's mother
Suresh as Suresh
J. P. K. Gokul as Gokul
Udhay as Ezhil
Mahendran
Sathyan
Elango
Pramod
Stalin
Latha

Production
After directing the controversial film Kaatrukkenna Veli (2001), Pugazhendhi Thangaraj had this time chosen to make a film whose story is based on love and affection between a brother and sister. Singer cum actor Yugendran signed to play the lead role while Kutty Radhika, who made her acting debut in the national award-winning Eiyarkai (2003), was selected to play the heroine. The film also starred Vignesh in the lead role playing the role of a loving brother. "This film will not be caught inside any controversy", said the director. He also said that the exposure of glamour in the film will be in an acceptable fashion. Bharadwaj composed the music and the cinematography was by Pavan Sekhar. The film was shot in Ooty and Munnar and is nearing completion.

Soundtrack

The film score and the soundtrack were composed by Bharadwaj. The soundtrack features 6 tracks written by Mu. Metha, Kabilan and Su. Ganesan.

The audio was released on 17 December 2004 in Kamarajar Arangam in Chennai. Veteran directors C. V. Sridhar, Bharathiraja and Mahendran attended the audio function.

Release
Balaji Balasubramaniam of bbthots.com wrote, "the film has a flimsy story, weak characters behaving in illogical ways and uncharismatic actors". Malini Mannath stated, "The performances are bad, to say the least, particularly Vignesh, normally a competent performer, but who's given one of his worst performances to date here" and criticized the "hasty scripting and shoddy narration".

The film bombed at the box-office and actress Kutty Radhika wasn't paid the full amount of her salary for her performance in the film.

References

2005 films
2000s Tamil-language films
2005 romantic drama films
Indian romantic drama films
Films shot in Ooty
Films shot in Munnar
Films scored by Bharadwaj (composer)